The Fourteenth Legislative Assembly Election was held on 13 April 2011 to elect members from 234 constituencies in the Indian state of Tamil Nadu. Results were released on 13 May 2011. Two major parties Dravida Munnetra Kazhagam (DMK) and All India Anna Dravida Munnetra Kazhagam (AIADMK) faced the election as coalitions of multiple political parties: DMK front consisted of 8 parties and the AIADMK of 11 parties. Vijayakanth's Desiya Murpokku Dravida Kazhagam (DMDK), which had contested the previous elections independently, allied with the AIADMK coalition. Marumalarchi Dravida Munnetra Kazhagam boycotted the election following a disagreement with Jayalalithaa over seat-sharing. 
The outgoing Karunanidhi government was noted for the construction of new assembly building in Chennai, execution of various developmental projects, and implementation of programmes including free health care for the poor and issuance of a range of freebies such as color television to all. However, these were heavily overshadowed by other major issues such as incessant power cuts in households and industries, excessive sand mining, increasing prices of essential items, 2G spectrum case and undue influence of Karunanidhi's extended family in various aspects of Tamil politics and business and even media.

The election commission enforced stringent measures to curb the widespread abuse of power to bribe voters that were common in previous elections; it also imposed strict campaign discipline by imposing the 10 PM curfew. The commission headed by the chief election officer Praveen Kumar was commended for conducting the election strictly and fairly. The election recorded the highest polling ever in the state - 77.8% of the total electorate voted in the election surpassing 76.57% polled in 1967 election.

AIADMK front won the election-winning in 203 constituencies; the AIADMK party alone secured a massive majority in a landslide by carrying 150 seats and became eligible to form the government without requiring the support of its coalition partners. DMDK won 29 seats, more than the 23 seats won by DMK, and opted to serve as the official opposition party. Political analysts concluded that the election was a referendum on the outgoing DMK government and the powerful anti-incumbency sentiment helped the AIADMK coalition. J. Jayalalithaa along with 33 ministers was sworn in as the Chief Minister of Tamil Nadu for the fourth time on 16 May 2011 by the governor Surjit Singh Barnala.

Background 

The Karunanidhi administration was noted for various developmental projects and generous spending of the tax money for the implementation of various free schemes and issuance of freebies: The government provided 1 kg rice for 1 rupee, free health insurance for poor, free colour television and gas stove for all. It also provided job for over 500,000 people in various departments of the government and introduced free concrete house scheme for the poor. It also implemented various road, bridge and drinking water projects in Chennai and all over Tamil Nadu. However, the election was dominated by four major issues, increase in price of essential commodities, 2G spectrum case, Power outage and nepotism. Inflation was high during late 2010 to early 2011; The price of food and other essential commodities had increased exponentially affecting middle class and poor people: Onions were sold for Rs. 100, tomatoes for Rs. 80 and Jasmine flower for Rs. 1200 per kilo gram. This historical rise in price of essential food items was believed to be due to increased rainfall in North Indian states. The key issue that affected the people was electricity shortage in the State. The 2G spectrum case involved the issue of 122 licenses of the 2G spectrum to 85 companies including many new telecom companies with little or no experience in the telecom sector at a price set in the year 2001. The case was alleged to have costed 677.19 billion  (US$15.03 billion) to the Indian exchequer. A. Raja, Union telecommunications minister from Dravida Munnetra Kazhagam was arrested by Central Bureau of Investigation (CBI) in relation to the case. Kanimozhi, Rajya Sabha member from DMK and Chief minister's daughter and Sharad Kumar of Kalaignar TV were also included in the chargesheet filed by CBI. The five years of Karunanidhi's rule also saw an undue influence of his extended family members in various aspects of Tamil business and politics

Parties and coalitions

All India Anna Dravida Munnetra Kazhagam coalition 
Electoral alliances began to take shape in late 2010. J. Jayalalithaa, the leader of All India Anna Dravida Munnetra Kazhagam (AIADMK) characterised the election as a turning point in Tamil Nadu history similar to 1967 election. She was alluding to the major political changes that took place in Tamil Nadu after 1967 election in which Dravida Munnetra Kazhagam defeated Indian National Congress for the first time and subsequently, Congress has then never won an election in the state until date.

Manithaneya Makkal Katchi, political wing of Tamil Nadu Muslim Munnetra Kazhagam (TMMK) constituted a five-member committee to hold consultations with All India Anna Dravida Munnetra Kazhagam (AIADMK) for seat sharing. The party had decided to support AIADMK in a resolution adopted at a high-level meeting citing deteriorating law and order and corruption. Naam Tamilar Iyakkam coordinator Seeman also expressed his support for AIADMK on 10 January and said his decision is based on his opposition to INC which he claimed works against the interests of Sri Lankan Tamils. Cho Ramaswamy, founder of Thuglak magazine, was actively involved in the formation of alliances. He supported AIADMK and encouraged other parties to do so as well. On the 41st anniversary of the founding of Thuglak on 14 January, he delivered an address that strongly opposed ruling DMK party. He encouraged Desiya Murpokku Dravida Kazhagam (DMDK) to forge an alliance with AIADMK. Communist Party of India Tamil Nadu state secretary D. Pandian also called for DMDK to join the AIADMK coalition to defeat DMK and officially announced the continuation of CPI's coalition with AIADMK on 29 January. Communist Party of India (Marxist) (CPM) announced its decision to contest the election with AIADMK on 25 January.

Despite the strained relationship between Indian National Congress (INC) and Dravida Munnetra Kazhagam (DMK), AIADMK general secretary Jayalalithaa ruled out coalition with INC on 19 January. Tamil actor Karthik announced his party's (Ahila India Naadalum Makkal Katchi) support to AIADMK after meeting Jayalalithaa on 19 January. Hindu Munnani leader Rama Gopalan ruled out support to AIADMK coalition on 20 January citing the participation of anti-Hindu forces in the fold.
DMDK officially announced their alliance with AIADMK and started their negotiations. This brought to an end the possibilities of third front and DMDK contesting the elections on their own.

Vijay's Makkal Iyakkam supported AIADMK Front. He delivered a speech in a rally attended by an estimated 20,000 to 30,000 people in Nagapattinam on 22 February condemning the actions of Sri Lankan military against Tamil Nadu fishermen. S. A. Chandrasekhar, noted film director and father of actor Vijay met with Jayalalithaa three times during the run-up to the election and announced Makkal Iyakkam's decision to support the AIADMK front in Tiruchirappalli on 27 March.

Seat allotment
In the middle of March, amidst discussion to finalise the allocation of constituencies, AIADMK surprised its allies by unilaterally deciding the 160 constituencies in which it will field candidates. The list included constituencies won by the CPI, CPM, Forward Bloc and Pudhiya Thamizhagam in the previous election. Marumalarchi Dravida Munnetra Kazhagam (MDMK) was not allotted any constituency. After the coalition partners threatened to form a third front under DMDK, AIADMK gave in to their demands. Most of the seats AIADMK took from its alliance partners were given back bringing the standoff to an end. However MDMK was not given the number of seats it asked for and hence Vaiko left AIADMK led alliance and boycotted the elections.

The final seat allotment was:

Dravida Munnetra Kazhagam coalition 

Tamil Nadu Congress Committee president K. V. Thankabalu confirmed the continuation of his party's alliance with DMK on 21 January. DMK pulled out of the ruling coalition at the centre on 5 March amid disagreements with Congress over seat sharing. After three days, the parties struck a deal in which DMK gave in to the demand and allowed Congress to contest in 63 seats. Abdul Rahman, Member of Parliament from Vellore constituency announced the continuation of Indian Union Muslim League's coalition with DMK on 24 January 2011. After meeting Karunanidhi at his home on 16 January, Viduthalai Chiruthaigal Katchi leader Thol. Thirumavalavan said his party will work for the victory of DMK coalition. In a speech given during the wedding of Hindu Religious and Charitable Endowments Minister Periyakaruppan's son in Chennai, Karunanidhi expressed his desire to step down from Chiefministership and continue as the leader of the party. Karunanidhi, during his trip to New Delhi for attending Chief Ministers meeting on 30 January, said that Indian National Congress, Viduthalai Chiruthaigal, Muslim League and Pattali Makkal Katchi are in the DMK coalition. But Ramadoss, the leader of PMK denied that and said no final decision has been taken on coalition. However PMK later joined the DMK alliance and was allotted 31 seats. It was later reduced to 30 to accommodate Congress which was firm on contesting 63 seats. Mylapore MLA and actor-turned politician S. V. Shekhar, joined Congress on 6 February 2011 after being expelled from AIADMK in 2009. Although Mylapore constituency was allotted to congress party, it did not give the chance to S.V. Shekhar. Instead the party allotted it to Jayanthi Thangabalu, the wife of TN Congress president K.V. Thangabalu. However her nomination was rejected by election commission citing incomplete submission of relevant documents. The nomination of K.V. Thangabalu, who was the replacement candidate was accepted making him the official congress candidate.

Seat allotment 
Upset over the tough posture adopted by the Congress during the seat-sharing negotiations, Dravida Munnetra Kazhagam on 5 March decided to pull out its Ministers from the Union government and provide only issue-based support. A resolution to this effect was adopted at a meeting of the high-level committee of the party at Anna Arivalayam, the party headquarters.
But after days of intense bargaining, Dravida Munnetra Kazhagam (DMK) and the Congress on 9 March struck a deal, under which the Congress would contest 63 seats.

The final seat allotment was:

Notes: Vithudalai Chiruthaigal Katchi Used Both Candles and Television symbol.

Other parties and associations
Marumalarchi Dravida Munnetra Kazhagam (MDMK) boycotted the election following its withdrawal from the AIADMK alliance as AIADMK did not award the party any coalition constituency. Makkal Sakthi Katchi (Lok Satta Party), the party founded by Jayaprakash Narayan contested in 35 constituencies in 18 districts. Some of the candidates of the party were members/coordinators from the non-government organisation 5th Pillar who were famous for issuing zero rupees notes to fight corruption. The party was headed in Tamil Nadu by a steering committee composed of six people including Vijay Anand of 5th Pilar.

Bharatiya Janata Party (BJP) although a major force in North India had struggled to make a foothold in Tamil Nadu . BJP leader L.Ganesan declared on 13 January that BJP will go alone in the elections . BJP announced its Candidate list on 18 March. Subramanian swamy leader of Janata Party announced JP will face the elections in alliance with BJP and will contest in 10 seats. JD(U) has announced it will contest 8 seats in alliance with BJP.

Tamil film actor Karthik's Ahila India Naadalum Makkal Katchi entered the election as a member of AIADMK coalition. When no seat was allocated to his party by AIADMK, he decided to contest the election alone in 25 to 40 seats. His party with sizeable Thevar votes in southern Tamil Nadu is believed to eat into the AIADMK votebank. In 2006, former AIADMK minister Nainar Nagendran lost by 2,000 votes in Tirunelveli, where Karthik's party polled more than the margin. Two weeks later his split from AIADMK, he announced his party will contest independently in 19 constituencies and support DMK in 213 constituencies.

Educationist-turned-politician T. R.Pachamuthu's Indiya Jananayaka Katchi (IJK) leads the third front. It comprises Tamizhaga Munnetra Kazhagam of John Pandian, Samooka Samathuva Padai of retired IAS officer, P Sivakami, Tamil Nadu Vanigar Peravai and VOC Peravai. The front is fielding candidates in more than 150 constituencies .

Political observers feel that the IJK could poll 3,000 to 5,000 votes in many constituencies in Cuddalore, Villupuram, Perambalur, Ariyalur and Salem districts where Pachamuthu's Udayar community has sizeable presence. The Samooka Samathuva Padai will mobilise significant dalit votes in constituencies like Tindivanam, Krishnarayapuram, Haroor and Gangavalli. Sivakami herself is contesting from Gangavalli . John Pandian has some influence in Virudhunagar, Ramanathapuram, Thoothukudi, Dindigul and Tirunelveli districts.

Bahujan Samaj Party which is ruling in Uttar Pradesh has decided to field candidates for all 234 seats and will be contesting alone . The party announced its candidate list on 18 March. Puratchi Bharatham led by MLA JeganMurthy which was part of DMK alliance from 2004 left the alliance due to seat sharing issue. It contested 40 seats on its own. Social Democratic Party of India has also plunged into the Tamil Nadu election fray with a view to garnering Muslim votes. They are concentrating on Coimbatore, Ramanathapuram and some parts of Chennai. Ahila Indiya Parampariya Meenavar Sangam decided to contest in 27 constituencies that constitute a major population of fishermen. The decision was made in a meeting of fishermen's unions from across Tamil Nadu held in Pattinapakkam headed by its general secretary Rubeshkumar. Arundhathiar (a section of dalits) outfit headed by R Adhiyaman has fielded candidates in 20 segments in western Tamil Nadu .

Campaign

AIADMK front

DMDK launched a vigorous campaign to defeat DMK; It made a resolution to call all parties to come together to defeat the ruling DMK in a conference held in Salem on 8 January presided over by its leader Vijayakanth.
AIADMK general secretary Jayalalithaa campaigned supporting the candidates of her alliance across the entire state from 24 March until on 11 April. She promised to provide the people of Tamil Nadu with golden reign, if they voted out the ruling party. From the Tamil film industry, film directors R. V. Udayakumar and S. A. Chandrasekhar and actors Vijay, Senthil, Gundu Kalyanam, Ponnambalam, C. R. Saraswathi, Radha Ravi and Anandaraj campaigned for the AIADMK front. Communist Party of India (Marxist) general secretary Prakash Karat characterised the DMK's rule as a dark chapter in the history of Tamil Nadu and the 2G spectrum case had shamed its people. Communist Party of India general secretary A. B. Bardhan exhorted Jayalalithaa to lead the battle to unseat the corrupt regime at the centre after its victory in Tamil Nadu.

DMK front

S. Ramadoss, leader of Pattali Makkal Katchi expressed his dissatisfaction with people from film industry ruling Tamil Nadu since 1967. He also urged voters not to vote for Vijayakanth with long career as a Tamil actor. Expressing dissatisfaction that he could not be elected to Chief Ministership, Ramadoss complained – in a meeting held in Mayilam – that Vanniars with a total population of 25 million in Tamil Nadu never elected one of their own for Chief Minister of Tamil Nadu.
Kongunadu Munnetra Kazhagam (KMK), a political party in the western districts of Tamil Nadu, complained about the neglect of Kongu region by the successive governments in a conference held at Karur. Er. Eswaran, general secretary of KMK, urged the government to focus more on infrastructure development in the Kongu region. Comedy actor Vadivelu campaigned for the DMK Front. Telugu actor and politician Chiranjeevi who had recently merged his party Praja Rajyam with Congress in Andhra Pradesh also campaigned for the DMK front. Actor turned Union Minister Napoleon, director K. Bhagyaraj, and actors Khushbu and Vaagai Chadrasekar campaigned for DMK . Congress President Sonia Gandhi shared the stage with Tamil Nadu Chief Minister M Karunanidhi in an election rally highlighting the strides made by the state under the latter's leadership. Addressing a rally near Marina beach in Chennai, Gandhi said Tamil Nadu had become a front-ranking state whose ideas of development and welfare were copied by the rest. All India Congress Committee general secretary Rahul Gandhi appealed to the people of Tamil Nadu to support the Democratic Progressive Alliance to further the development and socialistic agenda of the State for the next five years. Addressing an election rally which was presided over by Union Home Minister P. Chidambaram, he said that Tamil Nadu was one of the most progressive States in the country. It had achieved an important place in industrial, textile, automobile sectors and information technology; A number of social welfare schemes were being implemented. It was leading in health care and higher education in the country.

Manifestoes
The manifesto of the two largest in the legislative assembly were:

AIADMK
AIADMK general secretary J. Jayalalithaa released election manifesto for the election that mentioned it would give:
20 kg of free rice for ration-card holders.
Laptops for students from classes XI.
Free fans, mixers and grinders.
Free mineral water to BPL families.
Monorail for Chennai.
Promised new power generation projects and IT Industries in Coimbatore West and development of Small Scale Industries in Madurai South.

DMK
DMK president M. Karunanidhi released election manifesto for the election that mentioned it would give:
Free laptops for all college students and free mixer or grinder for women.
Rural schemes and Metro Rail for Coimbatore and Madurai.

Election Commission actions
The election commission was commended for conducting the election in a strict and fair manner. It enforced stringent measures to curb use of money power to bribe voters by paying them cash. It also strictly enforced 10 PM curfew on campaigning. DMK chief M Karunanidhi and his ally PMK founder S Ramadoss accused the EC of bringing about an emergency like situation in the State while such a situation was not prevalent in the other poll-bound States. CEC has said the people were happy about the conduct of elections, the CEC displayed an SMS from Chennai which read "earlier EC just announced elections. Only now they are conducting them. This is just one sample of people’s response".
Some of the actions taken by Returning officers in the State
The EC appointed flying squads and I–T teams recently seized more than Rs 50 million, largest ever in the state, from the roof of an empty bus in Trichy.
The Election Commission is probing alleged purchase of nine lakh T-shirts costing more than Rs 110 million by ruling DMK from a single shop in Tirupur district of poll bound Tamil Nadu.
Election Officials have seized unauthorised cash of over Rs 530 million in cash out of which Rs 420 million are from Tamil Nadu alone
The biggest seizure of cash has come from Madurai district at Rs. 39.1 million. Madurai district collector U. Sahayam has said only Rs. 371,000 of the cash seized in the district has been reclaimed with documented proof. The EC had earlier transferred the collector and appointed Sahayam as the collector .EC also transferred the superintendent of police in Madurai district, key officials in the administration; it is also supervising the use of wedding halls to ensure that the premises are not misused.

Cases registered
Tiruvarur town police have registered a case against film actor Vadivelu for his denigrating speech against founder of Desiya Murpokku Dravida Kazhagam (DMDK) Vijayakant on 23 March.
Actress and DMK star speaker Khushboo has been booked under two cases for allegedly violating the Model Code of Conduct. The first case pertained to the actress allegedly blocking the road and interrupting traffic while campaigning for her party at Palanichetti area in the district, police said. The second case was booked when a combined eight cars were found to be following the vehicle of the actress without prior permission at two places in the district, police said. All the eight vehicles had been seized, they said.
Melur Assistant Returning Officer, P. Kalimuthu had stated that DMK workers, accompanied by Mr. Alagiri, had been to the temple, where a large number of local elders were present. The flying squad had received information that the political party functionaries might distribute cash. They rushed to the spot and videographed the visit. This resulted in a scuffle. In the melee, the videographer [appointed by ECI] was roughed up. On the basis of Mr. Kalimuthu's complaint with Keelavalavu police, a case was registered against Mr. Alagiri, Deputy Mayor P.M. Mannan, two local DMK functionaries Regupathi and Thirugnanam and 50 others for waylaying and obstructing officials from discharging their duty.
DMK Member of Parliament J.K. Ritheesh and seven others were arrested for allegedly assaulting a man and others when a clash broke out on Monday night between his supporters and a group over an issue of relaying a road near Ramanathapuram .
Election Commission of India has sent notices, based on the complaint of the DMK to AIADMK general secretary Jayalalithaa and her ally DMDK general secretary Vijayakant for their alleged personal attacks against chief minister M. Karunanidhi and his family during electioneering.

Opinion polls

Pre-poll surveys
Most non-partisan pre-polls found AIADMK+ winning comfortably in this election. The pre-polls indicated a great deal of anger towards the incumbent government, due to corruption allegations and recent food price rises. Also AIADMK was aided by including DMDK and its leader Vijaykanth, which has had on average a 10% vote share in recent elections in Tamil Nadu.

Post-poll surveys

Since exit polls are banned by ECI, Headlines Today-ORG Poll, conducted a post-poll survey, where they polled voters after they voted in their houses. Post polls conducted by Headlines Today-ORG Poll, found this election to be a toss-up, with DMK gaining a lot of ground in the last few weeks before the election. The exit poll particularly noted a late swing towards the incumbent in the rural communities of Tamil Nadu, which allowed the DMK and its alliance to increase its overall vote share percentage from 45% in the pre-poll survey to 50% post-poll. A couple of weeks after the Headlines today post poll, a few post polls showed the exact opposite result, with CNN-IBN and Asianet post poll giving AIADMK+, the majority of the same margin.

Polling 
Source: Tamil Nadu Election Website

Poll notification was issued on 19 March. The last date of filing nominations was 26 March and candidates were allowed to withdraw their nominations until 30 March. The state election commission scrutinised the nominations on 28 March. Election was held in a single phase on 13 April 2011. 77.8% of the electorate voted in the election, the highest ever in the history of all elections conducted in Tamil Nadu surpassing 76.57% polled in 1967 election. Karur district registered highest turnout of 86.4% followed by Ariyalur district of 84.1%. Chennai district and Kanyakumari district polled the lowest number of votes, 68.2% and 69% respectively.

Result

Results by pre-poll alliance

By constituency

Reactions
M. Karunanidhi submitted his resignation to Governor Surjit Singh Barnala, thus paving way for Jayalalithaa to swear-in on 16 May. After the election, Jayalalithaa thanked her supporters and said "this is not a victory for me, but a victory for the state and the country". She further stated that she wants to "rebuild the state, from the havoc created by the previous government" and insisted that she does not plan to share power with her allies. DMDK leader, Vijaykanth, after being the second largest party in the new assembly and an important ally of AIADMK, stated that this is a "victory for the people and an end to family rule". TDP leader and former Chief Minister of Andhra Pradesh, Chandrababu Naidu, called and congratulated Jayalalithaa on her "victory over corruption". After the loss, Congress leader Jayanthi Natarajan, conceded defeat and wished the best for incoming CM, Jayalalithaa. While she admitted that 2G spectrum case played a huge role in their defeat, she further re-iterated that they have done everything they can to be transparent and that action has been taken against individuals responsible for the corruption. Union Minister, P. Chidambaram admitted that this was a huge loss for Congress in Tamil Nadu but does not believe this will affect the UPA government at the center, because this was a loss of an alliance led by DMK and not INC. M. Karunanidhi after the loss stated, "People have given me proper rest" and went on to congratulate the people of the state (on the election outcome).

Analysis 

Pre-polls and post-polls released before the counting showed a mixed picture and a close race and failed to predict the landslide victory for the AIADMK alliance. Including this election, no incumbent party has ever won a re-election in Tamil Nadu since M.G.R's victory in 1984 election. The results were consistent with the anti-incumbency factor that is common in Tamil Nadu politics. Closer look at the results show that AIADMK swept through the state winning by big margins. AIADMK and its allies won all the seats in 12 out of the 32 districts, with margins greater than 10% over its rival DMK and its allies. Out of those 12 districts, AIADMK+ won by margins greater than 15% in seven of them. In Chennai District, which once used to be a DMK bastion, AIADMK+ won 14 out of 16 constituencies with a margin of 13.1% over DMK+. In northern Tamil Nadu which is considered to be DMK's traditional bastion, DMK and its allies just won 4 out of 62 constituencies. DMK members blamed that the alliance with caste based Pattali Makkal Katchi and Viduthalai Chiruthaigal Katchi didn't go well with other castes and caused their downfall. Analysts felt that the strife between Vanniyars and Dalits could have played a role in DMK+ debacle in northern region. AIADMK's best district was the newly created Tiruppur, where they beat the DMK and its allies by a margin of 29.4%. This is consistent with the continued support for AIADMK in this region, since the former Coimbatore district was AIADMK's best performance in 2006 election. AIADMK+, did extremely well in its traditional stronghold in western Tamil Nadu. DMK, weak in this region, relied on its ally, Kongunadu Munnetra Kazhagam, who had a disappointing performance in this region losing by margins greater than 20% to AIADMK+. The western region was already affected with major issues like power cuts, agricultural crisis and industrial pollution and the DMK members after the election admitted that family rule could be one of the reasons for their downfall. DMK leaders after the election blamed the alienation of Dalits and other castes by KNMK due to the fact it is viewed as a party of Gounders. DMK+, on the hand, only did better than its opponent in four districts: Nilgiris, Kanniyakumari, Thiruvarur and Perambalur, all traditional DMK strongholds. The only region, DMK+ was able to be competitive is in the Cauvery delta region, which has long been a DMK stronghold. DMK's best district was Nilgiris, which includes A. Raja's former MP constituency. DMK+ did poorly in the Madurai district, where they found a lot of success in recent years (2006 by-election & 2009 LS election), due to Azhagiri's vigorous campaigning. They were not able to win a single seat in this district, and lost by a margin of 20.9% to AIADMK-CPI(M)-DMDK combine.

Post-poll data released by CNN-IBN, showed that DMK+ did the worst amongst the poor, especially in rural areas. Major issue cited by them as a reason for voting against the DMK is supply of electricity. Before the election, DMK was hoping that freebies and welfare schemes implemented by their administration would help them gain support from rural voters, who were an important electorate for the DMK to grab power in the previous election. This failed to take place, since many rural voters were unhappy with the distribution of these freebies in a disproportionate manner and lack of policies targeting towards income generation schemes in rural areas. This coupled with the recent food price rises resulted in a decline in rural support for the DMK. While spiraling prices, power cut, and DMK's family politics were important factors, many analysts agree that it was the corruption charges (2G spectrum scandal), that eventually led them to their ultimate defeat. This election saw one of the worst performance of Congress in Tamil Nadu, winning only 5 seats out of 63 seats it contested. During the campaign, they were marred with in-fighting between state Congress leader K.V. Thangkabalu and other Congress members, which added to their declining support in the state. In both Tamil Nadu and Pondicherry, Congress did poorly reflecting widespread anger and disapproval.

Government formation
J. Jayalalithaa was sworn in as the Chief Minister of Tamil Nadu for the fourth time on 16 May 2011. She submitted her unanimous election as the general secretary of AIADMK legislature party to Governor Surjit Singh Barnala on 15 May 2011. She was sworn in along with 33 other ministers at the Madras University centenary auditorium on 16 May 2011 by the Governor, the same venue she took oath in 1991 when she first became chief minister. She and all other ministers took oath in Tamil. The ceremony was attended by Gujarat Chief Minister Narendra Modi, former Andhra Pradesh Chief Minister N. Chandrababu Naidu and Communist Party of India (CPI) general secretary A. B. Bardhan among others.

References 

2011
2010s in Tamil Nadu
2011 State Assembly elections in India
April 2011 events in India